The 13th BRDC International Trophy was an Intercontinental Formula motor race held on 6 May 1961 at the Silverstone Circuit, Northamptonshire. The race was run over 80 laps of the Silverstone Grand Prix circuit, and was won by British driver Stirling Moss in a Cooper T53-Climax, who also set fastest lap and lapped the rest of the field. Jack Brabham and Roy Salvadori were second and third in similar cars.

This race marked the final participation by a Vanwall car, John Surtees bringing it home in fifth place.

Results

References

BRDC International Trophy
BRDC International Trophy
BRDC
BRDC International Trophy